Liu Dong (born 27 December 1973 in Jinzhou) is a retired Chinese middle-distance runner. She holds the current Asian record over 800 metres with 1:55.54 minutes. She set that record while winning at the 7th Chinese National Games. Her personal best over 1500 metres was 3:56.31 minutes. She was trained from 1991 to 1993 by the famous Ma Junren in Liaoning Province.

She is married to Spanish coach Luis Miguel Landa and lives in Spain. She competed at the 2014 Cross della Vallagarina and placed 15th.

Liu acted as a rabbit for the famous 1500 at the 1993 Chinese National Games, where Qu Yunxia set the world record that stood for almost 22 years.  When Liu set her personal best in the same race four years later, it was the #15 mark of all time.  Only 5 non-Chinese women had ever run faster, the others on the list being the Chinese women who had beaten Liu in those two races.

International competitions

Honors and awards
 Special Prize of the  XXXV Career of Science  of the Superior Council of Scientific Research. "By their professional values", Madrid (ESP) 2015.
 Prize "As Image for the World in Sport and Culture" of "The World Sport and Culture Exchange Communication Festival", Beijing (CHI) 2016.

Publications
"Long distance training for women". Libros Cúpula

See also
China at the World Championships in Athletics

References

1973 births
Living people
People from Jinzhou
Runners from Liaoning
Chinese female middle-distance runners
World Athletics Championships athletes for China
World Athletics Championships medalists
Chinese emigrants to Spain
World Athletics Championships winners